Nepenthes × bauensis (after Bau, Sarawak) is a natural hybrid involving N. gracilis and N. northiana.

Nepenthes × bauensis is intermediate in appearance between its two parent species. It displays the clumping habit and vine growth of N. gracilis, but can be distinguished from that species on the basis of its larger leaves and stems. The influence of N. northiana is most obvious in the pitcher morphology. In particular, the peristome is wider than in N. gracilis and has scattered red bands. Pitchers are up to 15 cm high and may be pale green to purplish-red in colour.

Like its parent species, N. × bauensis is a lowland plant that grows at an elevation of around 100 m. It is terrestrial in nature and inhabits swampy areas surrounding the limestone hills to which N. northiana is endemic.

This hybrid appears to be very rare and only a few plants have been found. It is known from a single location. N. × bauensis is one of only three known natural hybrids involving N. northiana, the others being N. × cincta and a cross with N. mirabilis.

References

 Fretwell, S. 2010. Twelve days in Borneo – a dream expedition: part 4. Victorian Carnivorous Plant Society Journal 98: 6–13.
Lee, C. C. 2004. Nepenthes. In: Sarawak Bau Limestone Biodiversity. H.S. Yong, F.S.P. Ng and E.E.L. Yen (eds). The Sarawak Museum Journal Vol. LIX, No. 80; Special Issue No. 6: 71–77.
WildBorneo: Nepenthes × bauensis

Carnivorous plants of Asia
bauensis